The Silsila-e-Saifia also spelled as Saifi Urdu سیفیہArabic السیفیہ is a Muslim Sufi order based in Pakistan, with a following in the UK, Europe, the US, Canada, Fiji, Afghanistan, India, Bangladesh, Norway and various countries around the world. The order is linked to the lineage of Naqshbandiyyah Mujaddadiyyah, and the order's grandmaster (spiritual master)  is Akhundzada Saif-ur-Rahman Mubarak.

The Naqshbandia Saifia order (silsila)

See also
 List of tariqas
 Akhundzada Saif-ur-Rahman Mubarak
 Naqshbandi

References

Sufi orders